Hemogen is a protein that in humans is encoded by the HEMGN gene.

References

Further reading